Wheeling is an unincorporated community in Carrollton Township, Carroll County, Indiana. It is part of the Lafayette, Indiana Metropolitan Statistical Area.

History
In Wheeling there existed a post office from the 1830s until the 1930s, under the name Carroll.

Geography

References

Unincorporated communities in Carroll County, Indiana
Unincorporated communities in Indiana
Lafayette metropolitan area, Indiana